Aaron Donkor (born March 21, 1995) is a German professional American football linebacker for the Houston Roughnecks of the XFL. He played college football for Arkansas State and was signed by the Seattle Seahawks as part of the International Player Pathway Program in 2021.

Early life and education
Donkor was born on March 21, 1995, in Göttingen. He grew up in Göttingen playing basketball, before later going to Düsseldorf to play professional football in 2016. In 2017, Donkor moved to United States to play college football. He spent his first two years at New Mexico Military Institute, appearing in eight games as a freshman. As a sophomore, Donkor recorded 27 tackles, despite playing just four games. He also made 11.5 sacks that season. He transferred to the Division I Arkansas State University as a junior in 2019. Playing in six games, Donkor made 25 tackles. The 2020 season was canceled due to COVID-19.

Professional career

Germany
As a 21-year old in 2016, Donkor played professional football in Germany's top league for the Düsseldorf Panther. He led the German Football League that year with 14 sacks, 74 tackles, and 20-for-loss.

United States
In 2021, Donkor was signed by the Seattle Seahawks as part of the International Player Pathway Program (IPPP). Though 26 years old as a National Football League (NFL) rookie, he "made a strong impression" in training camp. He was placed on the international/exempt list to start the season. He signed a reserve/future contract with the Seahawks on January 10, 2022.

On August 28, 2022, Donkor was waived by the Seahawks and re-signed to the practice squad.

Donkor signed with the Houston Roughnecks of the XFL on February 28, 2023.

References

Further reading

1995 births
Living people
American football linebackers
Seattle Seahawks players
Arkansas State Red Wolves football players
German players of American football
German Football League players
German expatriate sportspeople in the United States
Houston Roughnecks players
International Player Pathway Program participants
People from Achern
Sportspeople from Freiburg (region)